In chemistry and thermodynamics, the standard enthalpy of formation or standard heat of formation of a compound is the change of enthalpy during the formation of 1 mole of the substance from its constituent elements in their reference state, with all substances in their standard states. The standard pressure value   is recommended by IUPAC, although prior to 1982 the value 1.00 atm (101.325 kPa) was used. There is no standard temperature. The superscript Plimsoll on this symbol indicates that the process has occurred under standard conditions at the specified temperature (usually 25 °C or 298.15 K). Standard states are as follows:
For a gas: the hypothetical state the gas would assume if it obeyed the ideal gas equation at a pressure of 1 bar
For a gaseous or solid solute present in a diluted ideal solution: the hypothetical state of concentration of the solute of exactly one mole per liter (1 M) at a pressure of 1 bar extrapolated from infinite dilution
For a pure substance or a solvent in a condensed state (a liquid or a solid):  the standard state is the pure liquid or solid under a pressure of 1 bar

For elements that have multiple allotropes, the reference state usually is chosen to be the form in which the element is most stable under 1 bar of pressure. One exception is phosphorus, for which the most stable form at 1 bar is black phosphorus, but white phosphorus is chosen as the standard reference state for zero enthalpy of formation.

For example, the standard enthalpy of formation of carbon dioxide would be the enthalpy of the following reaction under the above conditions:

C(s, graphite) + O2(g) -> CO2(g)

All elements are written in their standard states, and one mole of product is formed. This is true for all enthalpies of formation.

The standard enthalpy of formation is measured in units of energy per amount of substance, usually stated in kilojoule per mole (kJ mol−1), but also in kilocalorie per mole, joule per mole or kilocalorie per gram (any combination of these units conforming to the energy per mass or amount guideline).

All elements in their reference states (oxygen gas, solid carbon in the form of graphite, etc.) have a standard enthalpy of formation of zero, as there is no change involved in their formation.

The formation reaction is a constant pressure and constant temperature process. Since the pressure of the standard formation reaction is fixed at 1 bar, the standard formation enthalpy or reaction heat is a function of temperature. For tabulation purposes, standard formation enthalpies are all given at a single temperature: 298 K, represented by the symbol .

Hess's law 
For many substances, the formation reaction may be considered as the sum of a number of simpler reactions, either real or fictitious. The enthalpy of reaction can then be analyzed by applying Hess's Law, which states that the sum of the enthalpy changes for a number of individual reaction steps equals the enthalpy change of the overall reaction. This is true because enthalpy is a state function, whose value for an overall process depends only on the initial and final states and not on any intermediate states. Examples are given in the following sections.

Ionic compounds: Born–Haber cycle 

For ionic compounds, the standard enthalpy of formation is equivalent to the sum of several terms included in the Born–Haber cycle. For example, the formation of lithium fluoride,

Li(s) + 1/2F2(g) -> LiF(s)

may be considered as the sum of several steps, each with its own enthalpy (or energy, approximately): 
 , the standard enthalpy of atomization (or sublimation) of solid lithium.
 , the first ionization energy of gaseous lithium.
 , the standard enthalpy of atomization (or bond energy) of fluorine gas.
 , the electron affinity of a fluorine atom.
 , the lattice energy of lithium fluoride.

The sum of all these enthalpies will give the standard enthalpy of formation of lithium fluoride:

In practice, the enthalpy of formation of lithium fluoride can be determined experimentally, but the lattice energy cannot be measured directly. The equation is therefore rearranged in order to evaluate the lattice energy:

Organic compounds
The formation reactions for most organic compounds are hypothetical. For instance, carbon and hydrogen won't directly react to form methane, so that the standard enthalpy of formation cannot be measured directly. However the standard enthalpy of combustion is readily measurable using bomb calorimetry. The standard enthalpy of formation is then determined using Hess's law. The combustion of methane:
CH4 + 2 O2 -> CO2 + 2 H2O
is equivalent to the sum of the hypothetical decomposition into elements followed by the combustion of the elements to form carbon dioxide and water:
CH4 -> C + 2H2
C + O2 -> CO2
2H2 + O2 -> 2H2O

Applying Hess's law, 

Solving for the standard of enthalpy of formation,

The negative sign shows that the reaction, if it were to proceed, would be exothermic; that is, methane is enthalpically more stable than hydrogen gas and carbon.

It is possible to predict heats of formation for simple unstrained organic compounds with the heat of formation group additivity method.

Use in calculation for other reactions 
The standard enthalpy change of any reaction can be calculated from the standard enthalpies of formation of reactants and products using Hess's law. A given reaction is considered as the decomposition of all reactants into elements in their standard states, followed by the formation of all products. The heat of reaction is then minus the sum of the standard enthalpies of formation of the reactants (each being multiplied by its respective stoichiometric coefficient) plus the sum of the standard enthalpies of formation of the products (each also multiplied by its respective stoichiometric coefficient), as shown in the equation below:

If the standard enthalpy of the products is less than the standard enthalpy of the reactants, the standard enthalpy of reaction is negative. This implies that the reaction is exothermic. The converse is also true; the standard enthalpy of reaction is positive for an endothermic reaction. This calculation has a tacit assumption of ideal solution between reactants and products where the enthalpy of mixing is zero.

For example, for the combustion of methane, CH4 + 2O2 -> CO2 + 2H2O:

However O2 is an element in its standard state, so that , and the heat of reaction is simplified to 

which is the equation in the previous section for the enthalpy of combustion .

Key concepts for enthalpy calculations 
When a reaction is reversed, the magnitude of ΔH stays the same, but the sign changes.
When the balanced equation for a reaction is multiplied by an integer, the corresponding value of ΔH must be multiplied by that integer as well.
The change in enthalpy for a reaction can be calculated from the enthalpies of formation of the reactants and the products
Elements in their standard states make no contribution to the enthalpy calculations for the reaction, since the enthalpy of an element in its standard state is zero. Allotropes of an element other than the standard state generally have non-zero standard enthalpies of formation.

Examples: standard enthalpies of formation at 25 °C 
Thermochemical properties of selected substances at 298.15 K and 1 atm

Inorganic substances

Aliphatic hydrocarbons

Other organic compounds

See also 
 Calorimetry
 Thermochemistry

References

External links 
 NIST Chemistry WebBook

Enthalpy
Thermochemistry

de:Enthalpie#Standardbildungsenthalpie